Echis pyramidum, known as the Northeast African carpet viper, Egyptian saw-scaled viper, and by other common names, is a species of viper endemic to Northeast Africa and the Arabian Peninsula. Like all other vipers, it is venomous. Three subspecies are currently recognized, including the nominate subspecies described here.

This species, along with the closely related Echis ocellatus (both of the Carpet viper species) cause the most cases of snakebite deaths in the world. Two antivenoms are available to counteract snakebites from this species: Polyvalent Anti-viper Venom by VACSERA in Egypt and SAIMR Echis antivenom by South African Vaccine Producers.

Etymology
The specific name, pyramidum, refers to the Egyptian pyramids.

Description

Common names
Northeast African carpet viper, Egyptian saw-scaled viper, Egyptian carpet viper, Geoffroy's carpet viper.

Geographic range
In northeastern Africa it occurs in northern Egypt, central Sudan, Eritrea, Ethiopia, Djibouti,  Somalia, and northern Kenya. There are also scattered populations in the southwest of the Arabian Peninsula in western Saudi Arabia (south of the 18th parallel), Yemen, South Yemen (in Hadhramaut), and in Oman.

The type locality given is "Egypte" (Egypt).

Disjunct populations reportedly occur in Algeria, Tunisia, Libya, and northern Egypt. It is absent in southern Egypt.

Subspecies

References

Further reading
 Cherlin VA. 1990. [A taxonomic revision of the snake genus Echis (Viperidae). II. An analysis of taxonomy and description of new forms]. [Proc. Zool. Inst. Leningrad] 207: 193-223. (in Russian).
 Geoffroy-Saint-Hilaire I. 1827. Description des Reptiles. pp. 121–160. In: Savigny M-J-C-L. 1827. Description d'Égypte, ou Recueil des Observations et des Recherches qui ont été faites en Égypte pendant l'Éxpedition de l'Armée française, publié pars les ordres de sa Majesté l'Empereur Napoléon Le Grand. Histoire Naturelle. Paris: l'Imprimerie Impériale. (Scythale pyramidum, pp. 151–154 + Plate VII, Figure 1). 
 Golay P, Smith HM, Broadley DG, Dixon JR, McCarthy CJ, Rage J-C, Schätti B, Toriba M. Endoglyphs and Other Major Venomous Snakes of the World. A Checklist. Geneva: Azemiops Herpetological Data Center. 478 pp.

External links

 
 
 

Viperinae
Snakes of Africa
Fauna of Djibouti
Vertebrates of Egypt
Vertebrates of Eritrea
Reptiles of Ethiopia
Reptiles of Kenya
Fauna of Libya
Reptiles of Somalia
Reptiles of South Sudan
Vertebrates of Sudan
Reptiles of Uganda
Reptiles described in 1827
Taxa named by Isidore Geoffroy Saint-Hilaire